The Battle off Minicoy Island was a single ship action in January 2011 between Indian naval forces and Somali pirates, during Operation Island Watch. Pirates in the former Thai fishing trawler Prantalay 14 resisted and attacked the Indian Navy warship Cankarso and, in a long surface action off Minicoy Island, the Indians sank the hostile ship and rescued twenty captives.

Background
Prantalay 14 had operated as a pirate mothership in the Indian Ocean for several months before her sinking. After its capture, its Thai owners refused to pay a ransom for the return of the ship and its crew and four of its original crewmembers died of starvation while the crew was kept hostage by the pirates.

Battle
The pirates in the skiffs spotted the aircraft and immediately abandoned the attack and sailed back to Prantalay 14. The aircraft reported the sighting and three Indian Navy ships were dispatched, including the 325-ton INS Cankarso, a  under the command of Commander Arun Bahuguna. Cankarso was armed with a 30-millimeter CRN 91 naval gun and two 12.7-millimeter machine guns. Cankarsos radioman tried to contact the pirates, but was ignored, so a warning shot was fired towards the pirates, who returned fire with rocket propelled grenades and AK-47s. An exchange of fire commenced and lasted for twelve hours before shots from the CRN 9 heavily damaged the trawler.

Fuel drums that were stowed on the upper deck ignited and Prantalay 14 began to burn. At that point the survivors abandoned ship so the Indians ceased firing. Thirty-five men went into the water, of whom fifteen were pirates and twenty were Thai and Myanmar sailors on the vessel when the pirates captured it. Ten pirates were killed in the engagement, and the rest were taken to Mumbai in Cankarso as prisoners. There are no indications that any Indian sailors were harmed. Mumbai Police have confirmed that they have registered a case against the pirates for attempt to murder and various other provisions under the Indian Penal Code and Foreigners Act after entering national waters without authorization. A week or so later, Indian naval forces of Operation Island Watch captured Prantalay 11, another former Thai trawler which had been captured by pirates.

Aftermath
The Indian commander, Arun Bahuguna was awarded the Nao Sena Medal for his role in the engagement. The captured pirates were taken to India for trial where they were charged with kidnapping, kidnapping for ransom, attempted murder, and weapons related offenses. As none of the pirate's former hostages appeared as witnesses, the pirates were acquitted of kidnapping for ransom and sentenced in August 2017 to seven years imprisonment on the remaining charges. The pirates had spent six and a half years in prison prior to their sentencing.

See also
 List of ships attacked by Somali pirates

References

Conflicts in 2011
Naval battles involving pirates
Piracy in Somalia
Naval battles involving India
2011 in Somalia
Naval battles and engagements of Operation Island Watch
Combat incidents
January 2011 events in Africa
Piracy in the Indian Ocean
2011 in India
January 2011 events in India
Minicoy
History of Lakshadweep
Lakshadweep district
History of the Indian Ocean
2010s in Lakshadweep
Indian Navy
Battles in 2011